Werner Peters (7 July 1918 – 30 March 1971) was a German film actor. He appeared in 102 films between 1947 and 1971.

Biography
Peters was born in Werlitzsch, Kreis Delitzsch, Prussian Saxony, and died of a heart attack on a promotion tour for his latest film in Wiesbaden, Germany.

His film career started with the lead in Wolfgang Staudte's Der Untertan, produced in the young German Democratic Republic. Peters then worked in West Germany, appearing mostly in supporting roles in popular movies. He also established himself in the European and international film industry by frequently playing sinister German or Nazi characters.

Peters appeared in two episodes of the 1966 American television espionage drama Blue Light. These were edited together with two other episodes to create the theatrical film I Deal in Danger, released in December 1966, which included his role.

Selected filmography

 The Beaver Coat (1949) as Eberhard Schulz
 Der Kahn der fröhlichen Leute (1950) as Hugo
 Der Untertan (1951) as Diederich Hessling
 Anna Susanna (1953) as Kuddel
 Ernst Thälmann (1954) as Gottlieb Quadde
 Before God and Man (1955) as Anton Mechala
 The Devil Strikes at Night (1957) as Willi Keun
 The Heart of St. Pauli (1957) as Tanne
 The Copper (1958) as Mücke
 Restless Night (1958)
 Escape from Sahara (1958) as Brouillard
 Thirteen Old Donkeys (1958) as Oberlehrer Kasten
 Rosemary (1958) as Franz Josef Nagonski
  (1958) as Eugen Machon
 Court Martial (1959) as Kriegsgerichtsrat Brenner
 The Black Chapel (1959) as Heinrich Himmler
  (1959) as Alfred Kopetzsky
  (1960) as Hauptfeldwebel Krüll
 The Cat Shows Her Claws (1960) as German General
 Roses for the Prosecutor (1960)
 The Thousand Eyes of Dr. Mabuse (1960) as Hieronymus B. Mistelzweig
 Auf Wiedersehen (1961) as Paul Blümel
 The Return of Doctor Mabuse (1961) as Böhmler
 Blind Justice (1961) as François Lacroix
  (1961) as Zumbusch
  (1962) as Martin Droste / Bobo the Clown
 The Counterfeit Traitor (1962) as Bruno Ulrich
 The Door with Seven Locks (1962) as Bertram Cody
 Jeder stirbt für sich allein (TV film, 1962) as Kriminalkommissar Escherich
  (1963) as Herbert
 The Black Abbot (1963) as Fabian Gilder
 Scotland Yard Hunts Dr. Mabuse (1963) as Inspektor Vulpius
 The Lightship (1963)
 The White Spider (1963)
 The Secret of the Black Widow (1963) as Mr. Shor
The Curse of the Yellow Snake (1963) as Stephan Narth
 The Curse of the Hidden Vault (1964) as Spedding
 The Seventh Victim (1964) as Mysterious man
 Dog Eat Dog (1964) as Jannis, the butler
 The Phantom of Soho (1964) as Dr. Dalmer
 36 Hours (1965) as SS-Standartenführer Otto Schack
 Black Eagle of Santa Fe (1965) as Morton
 Battle of the Bulge (1965) as Gen. Kohler
  (1966) as von Walden
 A Fine Madness (1966) as Dr. Vorbeck
 I Deal in Danger (1966) as Gestapo Captain Elm
 The Peking Medallion (1967) as Inspector Pinto
 Dead Run (1967) as Bardieff
 Lotus Flowers for Miss Quon (1967) as Charlie Lee
 Assignment K (1968) as Kramer
 The Secret War of Harry Frigg (1968) as Maj. von Steignitz
  (1968) as Dr. Lenz
 The Killer Likes Candy (1968) as Guardino
 Death Knocks Twice (1969) as Charly Hollmann
 The Bird with the Crystal Plumage (1970) as Antique Dealer
 Under the Roofs of St. Pauli (1970) as Hausach, "King of St. Pauli"
  (1970) as Heinz-Fritz Bottke
 The Body in the Thames (1971) as William Baxter

References

External links

1918 births
1971 deaths
People from Nordsachsen
People from the Province of Saxony
German male film actors
German male television actors
20th-century German male actors
Recipients of the National Prize of East Germany